D&H Distributing is a privately held North American technology distributor to the IT (Information Technology) and consumer electronics supply channels, founded in 1918 in Williamsport, Pennsylvania. Currently headquartered in Harrisburg, Pennsylvania, the company distributes IT products, including server, storage and networking solutions, consumer electronics, videogaming, home networking, housewares, and sports and recreation products with a focus on resellers selling to small business (SMB) technology customers. These products are distributed via six locations throughout the US and Canada. The company's customer base consists of computer resellers, integrators, retailers, etailers and consumer electronics dealers. The majority of D&H's SMB (small to mid-size business) reseller customer base sells to regional offices in vertical markets such as healthcare, education, real estate, advertising, and finance.

D&H Distributing was a $4.3 billion organization in November of 2020 and is listed at #103 on the 2020 Forbes list of America's Largest Private Companies, making it one of the largest private employers in the Harrisburg, Pennsylvania region. The company ships out of six separate locations including its US headquarters in Harrisburg, PA; a Canadian headquarters in Brampton, Ontario; an Atlanta distribution center; plus additional locations in Chicago, IL; and Fresno, CA. In 2017, D&H added a warehouse location in Vancouver, BC, Canada.

History
D&H Distributing was founded as Economy Tire and Rubber, a tire retreading company, established by brothers-in-law David Schwab and Harry Spector. In 1921, the company began selling wholesale parts for automobile service industry, adding crystal radios by 1926 and moving into a distribution capacity by signing with radio manufacturer Philco. Consumer appliances such as refrigerators, washers, vacuum cleaners, and ranges were added to the company’s offerings. The company was renamed D&H Distributing on November 8, 1929. By the 1950s, D&H grew along with the boom in both post-World War II kitchen appliance sales and the advent of the television set.

In 1973, D&H established its Electronics Specialty Products Division. By the late seventies, the company entered the video-gaming market with the addition of Atari. As the 1980s approached, D&H licensed products from Texas Instruments, Packard Bell, Commodore Computers and Panasonic Printers, and expanded its consumer electronics linecard to form the distributor’s current Computer Products Division. In the late 1980s, it expanded nationally through the addition of warehouses in Chicago, IL; Boston, MA; and Dallas, TX.

The company added large-scale IT networking manufacturers such as Microsoft, Cisco and Lenovo between 2000 and 2006. In 2007, the company expanded outside the US with a Canadian headquarters in Mississauga, Ontario. In 2018, D&H announced its intent to purchase 275 acres of property in Lower Swatara Township, Pennsylvania to build a new distribution hub. In 2019, D&H relocated its headquarters to a 50-acre, two building campus with more than 240,000 square feet of office space.

Products and Services

D&H’s product offerings include information technology solutions, including remote work infrastructures, pro-AV, esports, servers, storage and networking solutions; plus mobility, consumer electronics, home entertainment, home networking and automation, small office/home office, video surveillance, digital imaging and videogaming products. Major vendor partners include companies such as Microsoft, Cisco, HP, Lenovo, Intel, Samsung, Sony, Toshiba, Dell and others. D&H launched an updated Cloud Marketplace platform in 2019, creating a hosted “everything-as-a-service” offering for value added resellers and managed service providers. In 2020, D&H added set of outsourced professional services for its North American SMB reseller partners including integration services, endpoint managed services, and a variety of project-specific services.

Current Leadership

Michael Schwab and Dan Schwab are co-presidents at D&H Distributing which was founded in 1918 by their grandfather. They were named co-presidents of D&H Distributing in 2008. Since D&H Co-Presidents Michael Schwab and Dan Schwab took over day-to-day operations, the distributor has grown from a $1.45 billion company into a $4+ billion company. During that time frame, the value of the company’s Employee Stock Ownership Plan has grown 300 percent. The company had 1,300 employees as of February 2020.

References

American companies established in 1918
Transport companies established in 1918
Companies based in Harrisburg, Pennsylvania
1918 establishments in Pennsylvania
Transportation companies of the United States
Transportation companies based in Pennsylvania
Radio manufacturers